Robert Daigle is an American government official who served as Director of Cost Assessment and Program Evaluation for the United States Department of Defense. Prior to assuming that role, he was  a staff member on the United States House Committee on Armed Services. Daigle served as a soldier in the United States Army and was Executive Director of the Military Compensation and Retirement Modernization Commission.

References

Living people
University of Vermont alumni
Columbia Business School alumni
Georgetown University alumni
United States Army soldiers
Trump administration personnel
George W. Bush administration personnel
United States Department of Defense officials
Year of birth missing (living people)